Richard J. Dumbrill  (Epernay 1947) is a British archaeomusicologist, pianist, composer and conductor.  Dumbrill is a relativist musicologist who opposes Universalism and Occicentrism theories in his field.

Dumbrill has studied the archaeomusicology of the Ancient Near East, especially the interpretation of cuneiform texts of Music Theory written in Sumerian, Babylonian and Hurrian.

Career 
Dumbrill's interpretation of music theory is based on his knowledge of Middle-Oriental Musicology.  He rejects (Pythagorean) ditonism and heptatonism, and particularly rejects the hypothesis of dichords in the Musicology of the Ancient Near East

Dumbrill translated the oldest song ever written, which was found in northwest Syria at the site of Ugarit. He reconstructed the Silver lyre of Ur (at the British Museum), from Woolley's notes, with Myriam Marcetteau.  Dumbrill also reconstructed the Elamite harp of the battle of Ulai, with Margaux Bousquet. Dumbrill donated one of his harps to the Ministry of Culture in Iraq 

Drumbill is the founder, with Irving Finkel of the International Council of Near Eastern Archaeomusicology  (ICONEA) at the Institute of Musical Research, School of Advanced Studies, University of London,. 

Dumbrill has lectured at Harvard and Yale and in Iraq, Beirut, Damascus, Leiden, Rotterdam, and Paris.

Works

Books
Semitic Music Theory 
The Musicology and Organology of the Ancient Near East, second edition. Published thesis. Victoria, Canada.(2005) 
Idiophones of the Ancient Near East in the Collections of the British Museum 121 pages, Publisher: Gorgias Pr Llc (12 Jun. 2011) Language: English  
The Silver Lyre of Ur Copyright Richard Dumbrill ICONEA PUBLICATIONS LONDON Published 28 May 2015 
Musical scenes on Seals and Seal Impressions of the Ancient Near EastRichard Dumbrill ICONEA PUBLICATIONS LONDON 2015 
The Truth about Babylonian Music Near Eastern Musicology Online 4 6 |2017-08| p. 91–121.
Hurrian Song H6, score, transcribed from the original Cuneiform text. ICONEA PUBLICATIONS - LONDON 
Elegiac Poem to Ishtar, score, Composed by Richard Dumbrill ICONEA PUBLICATIONS - LONDON 
An Old Babylonian Lullaby. Score. Set to music by Richard Dumbrill for the BBC. ICONEA PUBLICATIONS - LONDON
Ashurbanipal Wisdom Song. Score. This song was reconstructed by Richard Dumbrill after an original Wisdom poem dating from the first millennium BC. It was specially composed for the Great Ashurbanipal exhibition at the British Museum in November 2018. ICONEA PUBLICATIONS - LONDON. 
Song of Amun Re. Score. Composed by Richard Dumbrill on request from the Smithsonian Institution. ICONEA PUBLICATIONS - LONDON

Reviews
Co-editor of NEMO-Online with Amine Beyhom
Editor of ICONEA with Irving Finkel (2008)
 Co-editor with Bryan Carr of the Ernest McClain Memorial Volume, forthcoming
 Editor of Musical Traditions in the Middle-East. Proceedings of the International Conference held at Leiden University, 10–12 December 2009. Forthcoming.

Articles
 The Truth About Babylonian Music
 Middle East article, Music Prehistory to 1250
 New evidence for Neo-Babylonian Enneatonism in Music Theory
 Four mathematical texts from the Temple Library of Nippur
 Earliest Evidence of Heptatonism
 Goetterzahlen and scale Structure The Uruk Lute Elements of Metrology, The Morphology of the Babylonian Scale
 Is the heptagram in CBS 1766 a Dial
 Commentary on the new incised scapula from Tel Kinrot
 Entretiens de Musique Ancienne en Sorbonne

References

External links

Babylonian Musicology

 This short video lists the texts included in the series and gives the link to Dumbrill's book: A concise Treatise on Sumerian and Babylonian Music Theory
 Babylonian Musicology by Richard Dumbrill: H6, Richard Dumbrill explains his interpretation of cuneiform text H6
 Babylonian Musicology by Richard Dumbrill: CBS 1766, Richard Dumbrill explains the metabolisation of the linear enneatonic system into the cyclical heptatonic system.
 Babylonian Musicology by Richard Dumbrill: YBC 11381, Richard Dumbrill explains the survival of enneatonism in a late first millennium cuneiform text.
 Babylonian Musicology by Richard Dumbrill: N 4782, Richard Dumbrill explains the theory in cuneiform text N 4782
 Babylonian Musicology by Richard Dumbrill: U 7 80 left column, Dumbrill explains the construction of the right column of cuneiform text U. 7 80
 Babylonian Musicology by Richard Dumbrill: U 7 80, Richard Dumbrill's explanation of the theory in cuneiform text U.7/80, right column
 Babylonian Musicology by Richard Dumbrill: CBS 10996, Richard Dumbrill explains the function of cuneiform text CBS 10996
 Babylonian Musicology by Richard Dumbrill: Nabnitu xxxii / U. 3011, Babylonian Musicology. Understanding enneatonism by Richard Dumbrill
 CBS 10996 Richard Dumbrill comments in Kilmer's interpretation, Richard Dumbrill explains the misinterpretations of cuneiform text CBS 10996 and gives his own interpretation.
 A Music from Ugarit - Echo from the past: Dumbrill explains his method
 For the National Geographic Magazine, with Singer Sevan Habib.https://www.youtube.com/watch?v=1j23oggrReM
 The Thin edge of the Wedge  https://www.youtube.com/watch?v=GFbk8rHoq1Q

British ethnomusicologists
Living people
1947 births